The 1991 Women's Rugby World Cup Final was a rugby union match to decide the winner of the inaugural 1991 Women's Rugby World Cup. The match was between the United States and England, it took place on 14 April 1991 at Cardiff Arms Park in Wales. The United States were crowned the first-ever Champions after defeating England 19–6.

Route to the final 

The United States were placed in Pool 3 with the Netherlands and the Soviet Union. They defeated Netherlands 7–0 in Pontypool and then later thrashing the Soviet Union 46–0 in Cardiff. They met New Zealand in the semifinal at Cardiff Arms Park and beat them 7–0.

England were pooled with Spain and Italy in Pool 4. Their first match was against Spain in Swansea which they won 12–0. They beat Italy 25–9 in their last pool match and then went on to beat France 13–0 in their semifinal clash and earn themselves a place in the final with USA.

Match

Summary 
The Final took place in front of almost 3,000 people in Cardiff Arms Park. England led in the first half 6–3 after Gill Burns converted a penalty try. The second half belonged to the Americans as they scored 16 unanswered points with two tries from Claire Godwin and a try to Patty Connell with Chris Harju successfully converting two goals. The USA were champions in the end with 19–6.

References 

Final
England women's national rugby union team
United States women's national rugby union team
1991 in American rugby union
1990–91 in English rugby union
Women's rugby union matches
1991 in American women's sports
1991 in English women's sport
1991
Rugby World Cup final
Sports competitions in Cardiff